OpenWire may refer to:
 OpenWire (library), a dataflow library
 OpenWire (binary protocol), a binary protocol designed for working with message-oriented middleware